Kundahar(Nepali: कुँडहर)is the residential area of Pokhara, Nepal. Kundahar covers ward no 12,13,14 of the Pokhara Metropolitan City.

Education 
There are several government and private institution in Kundahar.

Public/Private Schools and Colleges:

 Kundahar Primary School
 Shree Amarsingh Model Higher Secondary School
 Kaski Modernized Academy<ref>{{Cite web|last=content="sNPACh0JX3YwnsWLaDGnjf_2ivqChcDoakDMVmLoiVo" />|first=
 Baseline Academy School.
 Balvidhya Mandir Secondary Boarding School
 Pokhara United Academy

Religious Places

Bhadrakali Temple 
Bhadrakali Temple (Nepali :भद्रकाली मन्दिर) is a temple on the East of Pokhara in Kundahar area, atop a small hill and is dedicated to Goddess Kali. Founded in the year 1817 BS, the temple shrines Hindu goddess of power and strength, Bhadrakali or Durga and covers an area of 135 ropanies. There are two ways to reach atop. The eastern way has 292 steps uphill to climb to reach the temple while another way from southern part 265 steps.

Matepani Gumba 

Matepani Gumba located in Kundahar area of Pokhara, Kaski District of the Gandaki Zone in western Nepal. It was established in 1960 A.D.by Nyeshang people who migrated to Pokhara from Manang. Situated on a small hill, east of the Pokhara city, the monastery is about five km from Mahendra pul. This gumba is situated on the top of a green hill mountain.

Masjid Aqsa 
Masjid Aqsa is a place of worship for Muslims. It is located at Miyapatan.

Economy 
Banks in the area include Muktinath Bikash Bank, Laxmi Bank, Kundahar Sahakari, and Prabhu Bank.

There are several industries inside Pokhara Industrial Estate.

Communication 
List of several Internet Service Providers(ISP) in Kundahar are:

 Worldlink
 Nepal Telecom
 Vianet
 Classic Tech

Transportation 
Linked With Prithivi Highway. Kundahar is  served by local public buses from Miyapatan to Bagar, Khaukhola to Mahendrapul, Chauthe to Bagar. Local taxis are also available.

Hotels and lodges 

 Royal Palm Resort

Gallery

References

External links
वार्ड नं १२

http://bhadrakali.edu.np/managment-senators/
https://www.facebook.com/bigsplashpokhara/?rf=1771162189589412
https://www.pokharafinance.com.np/our-branch
https://centreforaviation.com/data/profiles/newairports/new-pokhara-international-airport
https://www.tripadvisor.com/Hotel_Review-g293891-d338297-Reviews-Royal_Palm_Resort-Pokhara_Gandaki_Zone_Western_Region.html
https://kathmandupost.com/money/2020/06/14/construction-of-new-airport-in-pokhara-on-track-despite-lockdown
https://kathmandupost.com/art-entertainment/2015/08/05/poet-ali-miya-remembered
https://edusanjal.com/school/baseline-academy/
http://pokharamun.gov.np/content/%E0%A4%B5%E0%A4%BE%E0%A4%B0%E0%A5%8D%E0%A4%A1-%E0%A4%A8%E0%A4%82-%E0%A5%A7%E0%A5%A9

Neighbourhoods in Pokhara
Populated places in Kaski District
Tourist attractions in Nepal